Evensen is a surname. Notable people with the surname include:

Alfred Evensen (1883–1942), Norwegian musician
Andreas Evensen (born 1986), Norwegian boxer
Andrias Christian Evensen (1874–1917), Faroese priest, editor, writer, and politician
Bernt Evensen (1905–1979), Norwegian speed skater and racing cyclist
Carl Julius Evensen (1851–1937), Norwegian shipmaster and explorer
Dan Evensen (born 1974), Norwegian mixed martial artist and kickboxer
Erling Evensen (1914–1998), Norwegian cross-country skier
Frank Evensen (born 1962), Norwegian judoka
Henrik Evensen (born 1994), Norwegian cyclist
Jens Evensen (1917–2004), Norwegian lawyer, judge, and politician
Johan Remen Evensen (born 1985), Norwegian ski jumper
Lars Evensen (1896–1969), Norwegian trade unionist and politician
Per Egil Evensen (born 1950), Norwegian politician
Robert Evensen (born 1982), Norwegian footballer
Svend Evensen (1880–?), Norwegian judge
Tidemann Flaata Evensen (1905–1969), Norwegian politician
Vidar Evensen (born 1971), Norwegian footballer
Willy Evensen (1919–1997), Norwegian rower